James Kirk (1879-1957) was a Republican member of the Michigan House of Representatives.

Born in Fairgrove Township, Kirk was supervisor of Juniata Township for 14 years, and was elected Tuscola County sheriff in 1930. In 1942, Kirk was elected to the Legislature where he served four terms. He was defeated in the Republican primary in 1950 by Allison Green.

Kirk's father William had served in the House in the early 1900s.

References

Republican Party members of the Michigan House of Representatives
1879 births
1957 deaths